This is a list of Bien de Interés Cultural landmarks in the Province of Cáceres, Spain.

List 

 Iglesia Parroquial de Santiago
 Iglesia de San Juan Bautista
 Casa de las Veletas

References 

Caceres